James Ward Morris Jr. (November 14, 1890 – November 15, 1960) was a United States district judge of the United States District Court for the District of Columbia.

Education and career
Born in Smithfield, North Carolina, Morris received an Artium Baccalaureus degree from the University of North Carolina at Chapel Hill in 1912. He attended the University of North Carolina School of Law, but read law to enter the bar in 1913. He was in private practice in Tampa, Florida from 1913 to 1933.

He was in the United States Army from 1917 to 1919. He began officer training school at Fort McPherson, Georgia on May 12, 1917 and became a first lieutenant on August 15. He was subsequently assigned to Company C, 326th Infantry Regiment at Camp Gordon. In three months, he was assigned as adjutant of first battalion and became judge advocate. In May 1918, he deployed to France with his Battalion for World War I. In June, he was promoted to captain and assigned to the regimental staff of Colonel John C. McArthur.

He was in the United States Department of Justice from 1933 to 1939, as a special assistant to the Attorney General of the United States from 1933 to 1935, and as an Assistant Attorney General from 1935 to 1939.

Federal judicial service
Morris was nominated by President Franklin D. Roosevelt on May 23, 1939, to a new Associate Justice seat on the District Court of the United States for the District of Columbia (Judge of the United States District Court for the District of Columbia from June 25, 1948) created by 52 Stat. 584. He was confirmed by the United States Senate on June 15, 1939, and received his commission on June 19, 1939. His service terminated on November 15, 1960, due to his death.

He is buried at Myrtle Hill Memorial Park in Tampa, Florida.

References

Sources

1890 births
1960 deaths
20th-century American judges
Judges of the United States District Court for the District of Columbia
United States Army officers
United States Army Judge Advocate General's Corps
United States Army personnel of World War I
United States district court judges appointed by Franklin D. Roosevelt
United States federal judges admitted to the practice of law by reading law
University of North Carolina alumni